Before and After Science is the fifth studio album by British musician Brian Eno. Produced by Eno and Rhett Davies, it was originally released by Polydor Records in December 1977 in the United Kingdom and by Island U.S. soon after. Musicians from the U.K. and Germany collaborated on the album, including Robert Wyatt of Soft Machine, Fred Frith of Henry Cow, Phil Manzanera of Roxy Music, Paul Rudolph of Hawkwind, Andy Fraser of Free, Dave Mattacks of Fairport Convention, Jaki Liebezeit of Can, and Dieter Moebius and Hans-Joachim Roedelius of Cluster. Over one hundred tracks were written with only ten making the album's final cut. The musical styles of the album range from energetic and jagged to languid and pastoral.

The album marks Eno's last foray into rock music as a solo artist in the 1970s, with nearly all of his following albums showcasing more of Eno's avant-garde and ambient music, which was hinted at on the second half of Before and After Science. The album was Eno's second to chart in the United States. The song "King's Lead Hat", the title of which is an anagram for Talking Heads, was remixed and released as a single, although it didn't chart in the United Kingdom. Critical response to the album has remained positive, with several critics calling it one of Eno's best works.

Production 
Unlike Eno's previous albums, which were recorded in a very short time, Before and After Science was two years in the making. During this two-year period, Eno was busy working on his solo ambient music albums Music for Films and Discreet Music. Due to the very positive critical reception accorded his previous rock music-oriented album Another Green World, Eno was afraid of repeating himself but still wanted to release a high-quality product.

As on previous rock-based recordings, for Before and After Science Eno worked with a plethora of guest musicians. Several artists from German and British groups of the era contributed to the album, collaborating with Eno for the first time. Guitarist Fred Frith caught the attention of Brian Eno who was "excited by the timbral possibilities that [Frith had] been discovering" on his album Guitar Solos. Eno asked Frith to record with him, and this resulted in Frith playing guitar on the album. Jaki Liebezeit of the German krautrock group Can played drums on "Backwater", while German ambient music group Cluster contributed to the songwriting and instrumentation of the track "By This River". Eno had previously worked with Cluster on their album Cluster & Eno released in 1977. Additional musicians included Dave Mattacks, who played drums on "Kurt's Rejoinder" and "Here He Comes" and Andy Fraser, (normally a bass guitarist in British blues rock band Free), who played the drums on "King's Lead Hat".

Several musicians who had worked with Eno on previous albums returned as well. Percy Jones of Brand X and Phil Collins of Genesis, played bass and drums respectively. Other returning contributors included Robert Fripp, Paul Rudolph and Bill MacCormick. Phil Manzanera makes a brief appearance as well. "Shirley Williams" is credited on the album sleeve for "time" and "brush timbales" on "Through Hollow Lands" and "Kurt's Rejoinder". This is Robert Wyatt recording under a pseudonym. Working extensively with the musicians and his instructional cards—the Oblique Strategies—during the two years working on the album, Eno wrote over one hundred songs. The vast majority of this material has never been heard.

Music and lyrics 
Jim DeRogatis, author of Turn on Your Mind: Four Decades of Great Psychedelic Rock, described the overall sound of Before and After Science as "the coldest and most clinical of Eno's pop efforts", while David Ross Smith of online music database AllMusic wrote that "Despite the album's pop format, the sound is unique and strays far from the mainstream". According to David Bowie's biographer Thomas Jerome Seabrook, the album is "split between up-tempo art-rock on side one and more pastoral material on side two", while Piotr Orlov of LA Weekly categorized it as an art pop record. The album's opening tracks "No One Receiving" and "Backwater" start the album as upbeat and bouncy songs. "King's Lead Hat" is an anagram of Talking Heads, a new wave group Eno had met after a concert in England when they were touring with Ramones. Eno would later produce Talking Heads' second, third and fourth albums, including Remain in Light. The last five songs of the album have been described as having "an occasional pastoral quality" and being "pensive and atmospheric".

Opposed to Another Green World'''s music, which Eno described as "sky music", Eno referred to the music of Before and After Science as "ocean music". References to water in the lyrics appear in songs such as "Backwater", "Julie With..." and "By this River". Author Simon Reynolds noted themes of "boredom" and "bliss" through the album, citing "Here He Comes", about "a boy trying to vanish by floating through the sky through a different time" and "Spider and I", about a boy watching the sky and dreaming about being carried away with a ship, as examples. Eno's songwriting style was described as "a sound-over-sense approach". Influenced by poet Kurt Schwitters, Eno consciously did not make songwriting or lyrics the main focus in the music. Tom Carson of Rolling Stone noted this style, stating that the lyrics are "only complementary variables" to the music on the album. Lester Bangs commented on Eno's lyrical style on  "Julie with..." stating that the lyrics' themes "could be a murderer's ruminations, or simply a lovers' retreat... or Julie could be three years old". Schwitters' influence is also shown on the song "Kurt's Rejoinder", on which samples of Schwitters' poem "Ursonate" can be heard.

 Release Before and After Science was released in December 1977 on Polydor in the United Kingdom and on Island in the United States. The first pressings of the album included four offset prints by Peter Schmidt. The back cover of the LP says "Fourteen Pictures" under the album title, referencing Eno's ten songs and Peter Schmidt's 4 prints. These prints included "The Road to the Crater", "Look at September, look at October", "The Other House" and "Four Years". The album did not chart in the United Kingdom, but was Eno's first album since Here Come the Warm Jets to chart in the United States, where it peaked at 171 on the Billboard Top LPs & Tapes chart. "King's Lead Hat" was remixed and released as a single in January 1978, featuring the B-side "R.A.F.", which is credited to "Eno & Snatch" (in the UK, not the US). This single failed to chart and has never been reissued in any form.Before and After Science was re-issued on compact disc through E.G. Records in January 1987. In 2004, Virgin Records began reissuing Eno's albums in batches of four to five. The remastered digipak release of Before and After Science was released on 31 May 2004 in the United Kingdom and on 1 June 2004 in North America.

 Critical reception 

On the album's initial release, the album received very positive reviews from rock critics. Writing for Creem, Joe Fernbacher called the Before and After Science "the perfect Eno album", while Mitchell Schneider wrote a positive review in Crawdaddy, stating that he couldn't "remember the last time a record took such a hold of [him]—and gave [him] such an extreme case of vertigo, too". In DownBeat, Russell Shaw wrote that "[Before and After Science] is another typically awesome, stunning and numbing Brian Eno album—the record Pink Floyd could make if they set their collective mind to it." Tom Carson of Rolling Stone noted that the album "is less immediately ingratiating than either Taking Tiger Mountain or Here Come the Warm Jets. Still, the execution here is close to flawless, and despite Eno's eclecticism, the disparate styles he employs connect brilliantly." Critic Robert Christgau gave the album an A− rating, stating that he "didn't like the murkiness of the quiet, largely instrumental reflections that take over side two", but did not find that this "diminishes side one's oblique, charming tour of the popular rhythms of the day". In 1979, Before and After Science was voted 12th best album of the year on The Village Voices Pazz & Jop critics' poll for 1978.

Modern reviews of Before and After Science have also been positive. David Ross Smith of AllMusic awarded the album the highest rating of five stars stating that it ranks alongside Here Come the Warm Jets and Another Green World "as the most essential Eno material". The music webzine Tiny Mix Tapes awarded the album their highest rating, stating that it "is not only one of the best albums in Eno's catalog, but of the 1970s as a whole". Douglas Wolk of the webzine Pitchfork gave Before and After Science a perfect rating, calling the album "the most conceptually elegant of Eno’s '70s song-albums". Pitchfork placed Before and After Science at number 100 on their list of "Top 100 Albums of the 1970s", referring to it as a "lovely, charming album" and going on to state that, while "not formally groundbreaking, it's frequently overlooked when discussing great albums from an era that's romanticized as placing premiums on progression and innovation—and particularly in the context of Eno's career, which is so full of both".

 Track listing 

 Personnel Musicians Brian Eno – voices (on all tracks, except 4 and 9), piano (tracks 1, 2, 5-7), synthesizer (1, 3), guitar (1, 7), synthesized percussion (1), rhythm guitar (2, 5), brass (2), chorus (3, 4), 'jazz' piano (3), keyboards (4, 9, 10), vibes (4), metallics (5), CS80 (6-8), Moog (6, 9), AKS (7, 10), Minimoog and bell (7), melody guitar (9)

 Paul Rudolph – bass (1, 2, 5-7), rhythm guitar (1), harmonic bass (7)
 Percy Jones – fretless bass (1, 4), analogue delay bass (3)
 Phil Collins – drums (1, 4)
 Rhett Davies – agong-gong and stick (1)
 Jaki Liebezeit – drums (2)
 Dave Mattacks – drums (3, 6)
 Shirley Williams (Robert Wyatt) – brush timbales (3), time (9)
 Kurt Schwitters – voice sample (from Ursonate) (3)
 Fred Frith – modified guitar (4), cascade guitars (9)
 Phil Manzanera – rhythm guitar (5), guitar (6)
 Robert Fripp – guitar solo (5)
 Andy Fraser – drums (5)
 Achim Roedelius – grand piano and electric piano (8)
 Möbi Moebius – bass Fender piano (8)
 Bill MacCormick – bass (9)
 Brian Turrington – bass (10)Production'''

 Brian Eno – producer, cover design
 Rhett Davies – producer, audio engineer
 Conny Plank – engineer
 Dave Hutchins – engineer
 Cream – cover artwork
 Ritva Saarikko – cover photograph
 Peter Schmidt – art prints

Chart positions

Notes

References

External links 

 Before And After Science at youtube.com
Brian Eno – "Early Works" reissues at Astralwerks

1977 albums
Brian Eno albums
Albums produced by Brian Eno
Albums produced by Rhett Davies
Polydor Records albums
Island Records albums
Experimental pop albums
Art pop albums
Avant-pop albums